Filatima persicaeella is a moth of the family Gelechiidae. It is found in North America, where it has been recorded from Michigan and Maine.

There is a small white spot on the fold of the forewing about the middle, another opposite to it on the disc. Behind the space between these two is another minute yellowish-white spot. There are also small opposite costal and dorsal spots at the beginning of the cilia.

The larvae feed on Prunus persica.

References

Moths described in 1899
Filatima